Gerik (also Romanized as Gerīk and Garik; also known as Gejeh Qeshlāq, Gijo Qishlāq, Qeshlāq-e Garīg, Qeshlāq-e Jījū, and Qeshlāq Jījū) is a village in Chaybasar-e Shomali Rural District, Bazargan District, Maku County, West Azerbaijan Province, Iran. At the 2006 census, its population was 230, in 39 families.

References 

Populated places in Maku County